Tatiana Smirnova is a Russian curler. She competed at the World Senior Curling Championships in 2015, 2016, 2017, 2018, and 2019.

References

External links

Year of birth missing (living people)
Living people
Russian female curlers